Weeping may refer to:

 The human act of crying (also see wailing (disambiguation))
 The seeping of an open or healing wound, either of serum or pus, sometimes accompanied by a strong smell
 A growth form in plants with pendulous, draping branches, most often associated with weeping willow trees
 "Weeping", an anti-apartheid protest song